The Prime Minister's Office (PMO; ;) is the foremost governing body of the Finnish Government and one of the twelve ministries of Finland. Tracing its roots to the 1809-established Office Administrative Department of the Grand Duchy of Finland, it is currently headed by the Prime Minister of Finland and a State Secretary and located in the Government Palace in the Kruununhaka neighbourhood of Helsinki. Its main functions are to support the Prime Minister and the Finnish Government and to oversee the enactment of government programmes.

History 
The Senate of Finland was founded on 18 August 1809 in the Grand Duchy of Finland when Emperor Alexander I of Russia signed a standing order on its establishment at Peterhof Palace. The Senate was initially called the Governing Council until it was renamed as the Senate in 1816. The Senate of Finland was divided into the Economic and Judicial Divisions; the Economic Division was further divided into departments, such as the Office Administrative Department. On 1 October 1892, the Office Administrative Department was disbanded and the modern equivalent position of Prime Minister in the Senate, the Vice-Chairman of the Economic Division, was granted a support office in its place. The new unit was called the Office of the Economic Division. Following Finnish independence in 1917, the unit was renamed as the Prime Minister's Office on 27 November 1918 with the operations and staff remaining intact.

In 1918, the newly founded PMO was one of a total of eleven ministries in Finland. There have been numerous changes to the initial list of ministries (for example, the Ministry of War became the Ministry of Defence in 1922) and the number of ministries has increased from eleven to twelve, but the overall setup remained largely similar over the years. For most of the 20th century, the politics of Finland was mainly headed by the President with far-stretching control over the country's affairs. This arrangement led to the Prime Minister's Office having little control over either Finnish Government or Parliament. In the late 1990s, governing power was shifted from the President to the Prime Minister, and as a result, to the Prime Minister's Office.

Organization 
The PMO comprises some 550 staff, 56% of which are women and 44% men. It is led by the Prime Minister and monitors the implementation of the Finnish Government's programmes and assists the Prime Minister in the day-to-day management of government functions through several departments and units:

See also 
 Bureaucracy
 Diet of Porvoo
 Prime minister

References

External links 
 
 
 

 
Politics of Finland
Government of Finland
Government ministries of Finland